Skelly is a surname which is an Anglicised version of the Old Gaelic names O Scolaidhe" or O Scolaire.

Notable people with the surname include:

Ann Skelly (born 1996), Irish actress
Bill Skelly, British police officer
Bob Skelly (1943–2022), Canadian politician from British Columbia
Chas Skelly (born 1985), American mixed martial artist
Donna Skelly (born 1961), Canadian politician from Ontario
Hal Skelly (1891–1934), American Broadway and film actor
Jack Skelly (1841–1863), Union soldier in the American Civil War
James Skelly (born 1980), English musician, singer-songwriter and record producer
Joseph Morrison Skelly, American historian and columnist
Katie Skelly (born 1985), American comics artist and illustrator
Laurence Skelly (born 1961), Member of the House of Keys in the Isle of Man
Liam Skelly (born 1941), Irish barrister, businessman and politician
Michael Peter Skelly (born 1961), American businessman and former political candidate
Ray Skelly (1941–2019), Canadian politician from British Columbia
Thomas Skelly (1879–?), American football coach
Tim Skelly (1951–2020), arcade game designer and programmer
William Skelly (1878–1957), American entrepreneur, founder of Skelly Oil Company

References

Surnames
Surnames of British Isles origin
English-language surnames
Anglicised Irish-language surnames